Stradivarius is a 1935 drama film directed by Albert Valentin and Géza von Bolváry and starring Pierre Richard-Willm, Edwige Feuillère, and Robert Arnoux. It was made by Tobis Film as the French-language version of the film Stradivari.

The film's sets were designed by the art director Emil Hasler.

Cast

Reception
Writing for Night and Day in 1937, Graham Greene gave the film a poor review, describing it as "the worst film to be seen in London". Greene's main complaint was the unrealistic and overacted effect of "sublimated sexuality" that the titular violin has on the listeners. Greene also criticized the acting of Bercher and Gauthier in the "dreadful hark-back to seventeenth-century Cremona" where Stradivari creates the violin.

References

Bibliography

External links 
 

1935 films
German drama films
1935 drama films
1930s French-language films
Films directed by Albert Valentin
Films directed by Géza von Bolváry
Tobis Film films
German multilingual films
German black-and-white films
1935 multilingual films
1930s German films